Moelfre is a hamlet in the county of Conwy, North Wales, close to Abergele (3 miles north), Betws yn Rhos (4 miles west) and Llanfair Talhaiarn (3 miles south). A commercial fishing pond, some small places of accommodation, a small independent beer and mead brewery, a handful of farms and a logging enterprise are located in the region. There are no shops or amenities nearby (the closest being a petrol station and garage at Pentrefail Crossroads, 1 mile west, which provides basic foodstuffs for tourist campsites and locals in the area). A public house once located in Moelfre closed a few years ago and is now a large residential property. Running through Moelfre is the Roman road that was heavily used by Roman soldiers during the Welsh occupation. From the road Moelfre Isaf, a large hill (1040 ft) with views of Snowdonia, can be reached on foot. A hoard of Bronze Age axe-heads has been found on Moelfre Isaf and the hill was used for the lighting of a beacon (as part of a chain of other high places throughout Wales) to celebrate the marriage of Prince Charles and Lady Diana in 1981. Wild animals and birds are varied in the woodland and groups of wild deer are sometimes seen in the copses near Moelfre at night.

Populated places in Conwy County Borough